Loudon County is a county in the U.S. state of Tennessee. It is located in the central part of East Tennessee. As of the 2020 census, the population was 54,886. Its county seat is Loudon. Loudon County is included in the Knoxville, TN Metropolitan Statistical Area.

History

Loudon County was formed on May 27, 1870, from portions of Roane, Monroe and Blount counties.  Originally, it was named Christiana County, but a few days later the name was changed to Loudon in honor of nearby colonial-era Fort Loudoun. The fort was named for John Campbell, 4th Earl of Loudoun and a commander of British forces during the French and Indian Wars.  In August 1870, the county officers were chosen. On September 5, 1870, the county court was organized at the Baptist Church in Loudon. This church became the temporary quarters of the county court until the new building, built by J. W. Clark & Brothers, was finished in 1872. 
Bussell Island, at the mouth of the Little Tennessee River, was inhabited by Native Americans for several thousand years before the arrival of the region's first European settlers.  The Overhill Cherokee village of Mialoquo was located along the Little Tennessee near modern Tellico Village.  Fort Loudoun was constructed by the British near modern Vonore in 1756, and was destroyed by the Cherokee four years later.

One of the earliest American settlements in what is now Loudon County was a river port and ferry known as Morganton, once located on the banks of the Little Tennessee River near modern Greenback.  Morganton thrived during the early 19th century, but declined with the rise of the railroad in the latter half of the century.  The town's remnants were inundated by Tellico Lake in the 1970s.

Lenoir City is rooted in a plantation established by William Ballard Lenoir in 1810, which by the 1850s included a railroad stop known as Lenoir Station.  The Lenoir City Company, established by Knoxville financiers Charles McClung McGhee and Edward J. Sanford, platted modern Lenoir City in the 1890s.

The town of Loudon began as a ferry and later steamboat stop known as Blair's Ferry, established by James Blair and his brother-in-law, John Hudson Carmichael, in the 1810s.  The town changed its name to "Loudon" during the early 1850s, when it expanded following the arrival of the railroad.  The railroad bridge at Loudon was one of eight bridges targeted for destruction by Union guerillas as part of the East Tennessee bridge-burning conspiracy in November 1861, at the outset of the Civil War. The bridge was too well-guarded by Confederate sentries, however, and the guerillas abandoned the effort.

Geography

The Little Tennessee River joins the Tennessee River at Lenoir City.  The lower part of the Little Tennessee River is part of Tellico Lake, created by Tellico Dam near the mouth of the river.  Fort Loudoun Dam spans the Tennessee River just upstream from its confluence with the Little Tennessee, creating Fort Loudoun Lake.  The section of the river downstream from Fort Loudoun Dam is part of Watts Bar Lake.

Adjacent counties
Knox County (northeast)
Blount County (east)
Monroe County (south)
McMinn County (southwest)
Roane County (northwest)

State protected areas
Tellico Lake Wildlife Management Area (part)

Demographics

2020 census

As of the 2020 United States census, there were 54,886 people, 20,669 households, and 14,615 families residing in the county.

2010 census
As of the census of 2010, there were 48,556 people, 19,826 households, and 14,483 families living in the county. The population density was 212.03 persons per square mile. The housing unit density was 86.58 units per square mile. The racial makeup of the county was 95.35% White, 1.11% African American, 0.28% Native American, 0.59% Asian, 0.10% Pacific Islander, and 1.08% from two or more races. 6.99% were Hispanic or Latino of any race.

Of the 19,826 households, 23.52% had children under the age of 18 living in them, 60.10% were married couples, 4.13% had a male householder with no wife present, 8.82% had a female householder with no husband present, and 16.95% were non-families. 23.21% were one person and 11.17% were one person aged 65 or older. The average household size was 2.42 and the average family size was 2.82.

The age distribution was 20.32% under the age of 18, 58.19% ages 18 to 64, and 21.49% age 65 and older. The median age was 46.0 years. 50.93% of the population were females and 49.07% were males.

The median household income in the county was $49,343, and the median family income was $59,044. Males had a median income of $44,110, versus $29,441 for females. The per capita income for the county was $27,046. About 9.2% of families and 13.8% of the population were below the poverty line, including 23.8% of those under the age of 18 and 6.8% of those age 65 and over.

2000 census
At the 2000 census there were 39,086 people, 15,944 households, and 11,798 families living in the county.  The population density was 171 people per square mile (66/km2).  There were 17,277 housing units at an average density of 76 per square mile (29/km2).  The racial makeup of the county was 95.90% White, 1.14% Black or African American, 0.32% Native American, 0.21% Asian, 0.02% Pacific Islander, 1.43% from other races, and 0.98% from two or more races.  2.29% of the population were Hispanic or Latino of any race.
Of the 15,944 households 28.40% had children under the age of 18 living with them, 61.70% were married couples living together, 8.90% had a female householder with no husband present, and 26.00% were non-families. 22.80% of households were one person and 10.10% were one person aged 65 or older.  The average household size was 2.42 and the average family size was 2.82.

The age distribution was 21.90% under the age of 18, 6.70% from 18 to 24, 27.50% from 25 to 44, 27.70% from 45 to 64, and 16.20% 65 or older.  The median age was 41 years. For every 100 females, there were 95.10 males.  For every 100 females age 18 and over, there were 92.10 males.

The median household income was $40,401 and the median family income  was $46,517. Males had a median income of $33,567 versus $23,164 for females. The per capita income for the county was $21,061.  About 6.90% of families and 10.00% of the population were below the poverty line, including 12.80% of those under age 18 and 9.00% of those age 65 or over.

Education
The public schools in all areas of the county except Lenoir City are operated by Loudon County Schools.

Loudon County Schools

 Loudon High School
 Greenback School (K-12)
 Fort Loudoun Middle School
 North Middle School
 Eaton Elementary School
 Highland Park Elementary School
 Loudon Elementary School
 Philadelphia Elementary School
 Steekee Elementary School
Loudon County Technology Center

Lenoir City Schools
 Lenoir City High School
 Lenoir City Intermediate/Middle School
 Lenoir City Elementary School

Communities

Cities
Greenback
Lenoir City
Loudon
Philadelphia

Towns
Farragut (partial)

Census-designated place
Rarity Bay (partly in Monroe Co.)
Tellico Village

Unincorporated communities
Dixie Lee Junction
Unitia

Politics

See also
National Register of Historic Places listings in Loudon County, Tennessee

References

External links

 Official site

 Loudon County, TNGenWeb - free genealogy resources for the county

 
1870 establishments in Tennessee
Populated places established in 1870
Knoxville metropolitan area
Counties of Appalachia
Second Amendment sanctuaries in Tennessee
East Tennessee